Berrier Island is an island located by the borough of Dauphin, Pennsylvania, on the Susquehanna River.

References

Geography of Harrisburg, Pennsylvania
Landforms of Dauphin County, Pennsylvania
Islands of the Susquehanna River in Pennsylvania
Islands of Pennsylvania